Route 436 is a regional arterial road in Israel and the West Bank between Jerusalem and Givat Ze'ev. The southern portion begins as a major urban artery in Jerusalem's predominantly Hareidi neighborhoods leading to Highway 50 (Begin Boulevard), to Highway 1 and to the northern neighborhood of Ramot. Further north, the road runs alongside portions of Israel's West Bank Barrier as it approaches Givat Ze'ev. It crosses Route 443 to the Tel Aviv area and Highway 45 to Atarot and ends at the Beitunia section of the security barrier. The speed limit begins at 50 km/h along its urban section becoming 70 km/h as it passes through Ramot and then becoming 90 km/h as it leaves the Jerusalem municipality northwards. The road officially ends at the Beitunya cargo transfer terminal.

Route

The road begins at the heavily congested intersection of Route 417 (Bar-Ilan Street/Hativat HarEl Boulevard) and Shmuel HaNavi Street. The first 0.3 km is called Shmuel HaNavi Street, a continuation of the street south of the intersection. At its beginning, 436 is a major transfer point for intra- and inter-city buses. It is six lanes wide with two lanes in each direction on either side for private vehicles and two public transportation lanes along its median. The bus lanes along the center of the road are envisioned to become part of the "Blue Line" of the Jerusalem Light Rail.

Just before Givat Moshe Junction, at 770 meters above sea level, the name of the road becomes Golda Meir Boulevard. It passes Jerusalem's largest high tech park, Har Hotzvim, while descending into Emek HaArazim (Valley of The Cedars) at 630 meters. At Golda Meir Interchange, entrances in both directions provide access to Highway 50 (southbound). The road widens to eight lanes crossing the Sorek Stream and the Green Line at Yigael Yadin Interchange providing access to Highway 1 and Highway 50 (northbound). It then becomes six lanes and begins a steep ascent as the central artery through Ramot.

Leaving Ramot and the Jerusalem Municipality, the road becomes four lanes wide, passing the entrance to Nebi Samuel and reaching an altitude of 840 meters. It then begins another descent to 725 meters in the Plain of Gibeon. Along this section, the road passes alongside the security barrier next to al-Jib. Passing Mahane Giv'on, the road rises to 770 meters as it passes through Givat Ze'ev. Further on, it descends to 740 meters, intersecting with Routes 443 and 45. North of 443/45, the road provides entrances to Mahane Ofer and the Beitunia cargo transfer terminal, officially ending as numbered.

Junctions (south to north)

References

See also
List of highways in Israel

436
436
436